Balloon Maker is the second EP released by Midlake. The EP was originally released in 2005.

Track listing
 "Balloon Maker (Radio Edit)"  – 4:24
 "The Jungler (Alternate Version)"  – 4:35
 "Mornings Will Be Kind"  – 2:46
 "Balloon Maker (Album Version)" – 6:33

Personnel 

 Tim Smith — vocals, piano, keyboard, acoustic guitar, electric guitar, flute
 Eric Pulido — electric guitar, acoustic guitar, 12-string acoustic guitar, keyboards, backing vocals
 Eric Nichelson — keyboards, piano, acoustic guitar, 12-string acoustic guitar, electric guitar
 Paul Alexander — bass, double bass, electric guitar, keyboards, piano, bassoon
 McKenzie Smith — drums, percussion

Midlake albums
2005 EPs